Cerithiopsis flava is a species of sea snail, a gastropod in the family Cerithiopsidae, which is known from the Caribbean Sea and the Gulf of Mexico. It was described by C. B. Adams in 1850.

Description 
The maximum recorded shell length is 3.8 mm.

Habitat 
Minimum recorded depth is 11 m. Maximum recorded depth is 101 m.

References

flava
Gastropods described in 1850